Aegomorphus itatiayensis is a species of beetle in the family Cerambycidae. It was described by Melzer in 1935. It is Brown.

References

Aegomorphus
Beetles described in 1935